Henry Crumpe (fl.1380–1401) was Anglo-Irish Cistercian.

Life
Crumpe was an Oxford-based cleric from Ireland. He wrote sermons against John Wycliffe's views on dominion, though he was later condemned by the church as his views on the sacrament were deemed too close to Wycliffe. He is credited with terming Wycliffe's followers Lollards.

Crumpe was suspended from all teaching and disputation for a time in 1382. He then returned to Ireland, where he preached against the pastoral privileges of the mendicant friars, particularly their role as confessors. This resulted in the Dominican Bishop of Meath, William Andrew, charging Crumpe with heresy in 1385.

In 1391 Crumpe returned to Oxford, where he became reinvolved in controversy. He was brought before the King's Council and condemned by a commission including the Archbishops of York and Canterbury,  in May 1392. Suspended once again, he returned to Ireland, where he recommenced his disputations against the friars. In 1401 the Pope prohibited him from preaching on the subject.

Works
John Bale attributed the following works to him:

 Determinaciones scholasticae
 Contra religiosos mendicantes
 Contra objecta

References

Sources

 A New History of Ireland, volume one.

Alumni of The Queen's College, Oxford
English Reformation
14th-century births
15th-century deaths
14th-century Irish Roman Catholic priests
14th-century Irish writers
15th-century Irish writers
15th-century Irish Roman Catholic priests